Story of a Poor Young Man (Spanish: La novela de un joven pobre) is a 1968 Argentine musical drama film directed by Enrique Cahen Salaberry and starring Leo Dan, Niní Marshall and Rafael Carret. It is a remake of the 1942 film of the same name, which was based on a novel by Octave Feuillet.

Cast
 Leo Dan as Leonardo Martinéz Dan  
 Niní Marshall as Carolina 
 Rafael Carret as Mariano 
 Erika Wallner as Margarita Quijano  
 Guillermo Battaglia as Santiago Quijano  
 Roberto Airaldi as Don Lorenzo 
 Silvina Rada as Luisita 
 Los Títeres de Horacio
 Santiago Ayala   
 Norma Viola   
 Susana Giménez
 Abel Sáenz Buhr

References

Bibliography 
 Goble, Alan. The Complete Index to Literary Sources in Film. Walter de Gruyter, 1999.

External links 

1968 films
Argentine musical drama films
1960s musical drama films
1960s Spanish-language films
Films directed by Enrique Cahen Salaberry
Films based on French novels
1968 drama films
1960s Argentine films